The Moss Landing Marine Laboratories (MLML) is a multi-campus marine research consortium of the California State University System, headquartered at Moss Landing, California.

Organization
Moss Landing Marine Laboratories is part of the California State University, administered by San Jose State University (SJSU), and located in Moss Landing, California.  The main building is located at 8272 Moss Landing Road, . It was established in 1966.
At the midpoint of the coast of Monterey Bay, it is only a few hundred meters from Monterey Canyon, the largest undersea canyon on the west coast of the Americas.  As a result, researchers are able to reach areas with depths greater than 1000 meters in less than an hour by boat from the facility.

The facility is a sea grant college, which offers a Master's of Science degree in marine sciences through the seven universities that make up the consortium, as well as offering graduate and undergraduate marine science courses to the students of the campuses.

The seven members of  the Moss Landing Marine Laboratories consortium are:
California State University, East Bay
California State University, Fresno
California State University, Monterey Bay
California State University, Sacramento
San Francisco State University
San Jose State University
California State University, Stanislaus

Researchers at Moss Landing Marine Laboratories also collaborate with scientists at other institutions in analysis of marine chemistry and marine species.  One frequent partner for such collaboration is the Marine Mammal Center.

Research vessels
MLML operates two vessels, the  R/V John H. Martin, and the  R/V Sheila B.

Sea Grant
Moss Landing Marine Laboratories participates in the Sea Grant Colleges program by hosting an office of the UC Sea Grant Extension Program, affiliated with University of California, San Diego.

Projects 
The Submersible Capable of Under Ice Navigation and Imaging was a National Science Foundation funded research project for robotic under the sea ice for surveying and exploration in Antarctica from 2007 through 2009.

The Vertical Transport and Exchange of Ocean Particulate program (VERTEX) was initiated by Moss Landing Marine Labs in 1981 by Dr. John Martin. This project resulted in the development of the Iron Iron fertilization theory (then known as the Iron Hypothesis) which stated iron was a limiting factor in ocean water phytoplankton production and its influence for climate change. Dr.Martin was dubbed the nickname "Iron Man" for his role in this discovery.

See also
 Alliance for Coastal Technologies
 Hatfield Marine Science Center, a research facility associated with the Oregon State University and located in Newport, Oregon
 Hopkins Marine Station, a research facility run by Stanford University in Monterey, California
 John Martin (oceanographer)
 Marine Mammal Center
 Monterey Bay Aquarium Research Institute
 Scripps Institution of Oceanography, a research facility associated with the University of California, San Diego and located in La Jolla, California
 Southern California Marine Institute
 Woods Hole Oceanographic Institution, a research facility located in Woods Hole, Massachusetts

References

External links
Moss Landing Marine Laboratories website
Moss Landing Marine Laboratories blog

California State University
Biological research institutes in the United States
Laboratories in California
Oceanographic organizations
Monterey Bay
Research institutes in California
Universities and colleges in Monterey County, California
San Jose State University